Prong's Lighthouse is a lighthouse situated at the southernmost point of Bombay (now Mumbai), India in the Colaba (Navy Nagar) area. It was built in 1875 by Thomas Ormiston at the cost of Rs. 620255. It is one of three lighthouses of the city. The tower is painted in three horizontal bands, red, white, and black respectively. The lighthouse had a cannon during British rule to secure the bay. The lighthouse has restricted access as it is under military land. It is only accessible during low tide with special permission from the Indian Navy.

See also

 List of lighthouses in India
The lighthouses of Mumbai harbour - Timestravel Article

References

External links
Directorate General of Lighthouses and Lightships

Lighthouses completed in 1875
Lighthouses in India
Government buildings in Mumbai
1875 establishments in India
Transport in Mumbai